Abrostola tripartita (the spectacle) is a moth of the family Noctuidae. It is found throughout much of the Palearctic realm including all Europe (except for Iceland), Russia, Siberia Amur, Kyrgyzstan, and Kazakhstan.

Description

From South (1907) "This species, has the basal and outer marginal areas of the fore wings whitish grey, finely mottled with darker grey ; the central area is greyish brown, mottled with darker brown. The spectacle mark in front of the thorax is whitish grey, ringed with black, and the raised scales on the cross lines and central area of the fore wings are more distinct in this species" [than in Abrostola triplasia]

The larvae feed on Urtica species.

Gallery

References

 Barry Goater, Lázló Ronkay & Michael Fibiger: Catocalinae & Plusiinae. In: Martin Honey & Michael Fibiger (Hrsg.): Noctuidae Europaeae. Band 10, Entomological Press, Sorø 2003, .

External links

Fauna Europaea
Funet
Lepiforum

Plusiinae
Moths described in 1766
Moths of Asia
Moths of Europe
Taxa named by Johann Siegfried Hufnagel